Pseudoxyrhopus tritaeniatus is a species of snake in the family Pseudoxyrhophiidae. It is endemic to Madagascar. It is commonly known as the Three-Striped Ground Snake.

References 

Pseudoxyrhophiidae
Snakes of Africa
Reptiles of Madagascar
Endemic fauna of Madagascar
Reptiles described in 1894